Tarf Water may refer to:

Tarf Water, Perthshire
Tarf Water, Wigtownshire

See also
Tarff Water
River Tarff